("The Sea Coast") is a poem written by Avienius claimed to contain borrowings from the 6th-century BC Massiliote Periplus. This poeticised periplus resulted in an anachronic, non-factual account of the coastal regions of the known world. His editor André Berthelot demonstrated that Avienius' land-measurements were derived from Roman itineraries but inverted some sequences. Berthelot remarked of some names on the Hispanic coast "The omission of Emporium, contrasting strangely with the names of Tarragon and Barcelona, may characterize the method of Avienius, who searches archaic documents and mingles his searches of them with his impressions as an official of the fourth century A.D." Ora maritima was a work for the reader rather than the traveller, where the fourth century present intrudes largely in the mention of cities at the time abandoned, like the legendary Ophiussa. More recent scholars have emended the too credulous reliance on Avienius' accuracy of his editor, the historian-archaeologist Adolf Schulten. Another ancient chief text cited by Avienius is the Periplus of Himilco, the description of a Punic expedition through the coasts of western Europe which took place at the same time of the circumnavigation of Africa by Hanno (c. 500 BC).

Ora maritima includes reference to the islands of Ierne and Albion, Ireland and Britain, whose inhabitants reputedly traded with the Oestrymnides of Brittany. The work was dedicated to Sextus Claudius Petronius Probus. It also mentions the presumably mythical city of Cypsela in the Catalonian coast.[Verse 521]

The whole text derives from a single manuscript source, used for the editio princeps published at Venice in 1488.

References

External links
  Ora maritima in latin
  Ora maritima editio princeps
 André Berthelot: . Paris: Champion, 1934. 

4th-century Latin books
4th-century poems
Geography books
Latin poems
Peripluses
Travel books